Greene Peninsula is a mountainous peninsula within Cumberland East Bay, separating Moraine Fjord to the west from the main arm of Cumberland East Bay, on the north coast of South Georgia Island. The entire area was charted by the Swedish Antarctic Expedition (SAE), 1901–04, under Otto Nordenskjöld. The peninsula was named by the UK Antarctic Place-Names Committee (UK-APC) in 1979 after Stanley Wilson Greene, a British bryologist who worked in South Georgia.

Geography 
Many features in and around Greene Peninsula have been charted and individually named. Many names in the area were given by the Falkland Islands Dependencies Survey (FIDS) in 1951 following a sketch survey, mostly derived from names of chemicals used to prepare biological material collected there by FIDS personnel.  Unless otherwise noted, this applies to features described further in this article.

Shoreline and inland
Dartmouth Point marks the northernmost end of Greene Peninsula. It was charted by the Swedish Antarctic Expedition (SAE), 1901–04, and named after , which surveyed the area in 1920. The beach appears on earlier charts, but the name was given by FIDS for balsam, a type of resin.

It was named for the Sudan family of dyes.

They were roughly surveyed by FIDS in 1951 and named after the South Georgia teal, flocks of which frequent the ponds. It was named by FIDS after the red dye eosin.

Offshore features
The more northerly of the two is called MacMahon Rock, whose name first appears on a 1930 British Admiralty chart.

The island appears on earlier charts, but was not named until it appeared on a 1951 FIDS map. The feature is named for the chemical staining agent aniline.

References

Headlands of South Georgia